The Shadows of Avalon is a BBC Books original novel written by Paul Cornell and based on the long-running British science fiction television series Doctor Who. It features the Eighth Doctor, Fitz, Compassion, Brigadier Lethbridge-Stewart, and Romana III.

Plot
The novel is a partial sequel to the Virgin New Adventures novel Happy Endings.

Notes
This is the only original novel in the BBC Books range written by Paul Cornell, who had written multiple books for the prior ranges from Virgin.

External links
The Cloister Library - The Shadows of Avalon

2000 British novels
2000 science fiction novels
Eighth Doctor Adventures
Novels by Paul Cornell
Modern Arthurian fiction
Faction Paradox
Fiction set in 2012